Blind spot or Blindspot may refer to:

Ophthalmology and vision
 Blind spot (vision), also known as the physiological blind spot, the specific scotoma in the visual field that corresponds to the lack of light-detecting photoreceptor cells on the optic disc
 Optic disc, also known as the anatomical blind spot, the specific region of the retina where the optic nerve and blood vessels pass through to connect to the back of the eye
 Vehicle blind spot, areas outside of a vehicle that cannot be seen while looking forward, backward or through optical aids

Books
 Blindspot (comics), a fictional character in the Marvel Comics universe
 The Blind Spot (1921), an early science fiction novel by Homer Eon Flint and Austin Hall

Visual media

Film
 Blind Spot (1932 film), a British crime film
 Blind Spot (1947 film), an American mystery thriller film noir
 Blind Spot (1958 film), a British drama film
 Blind Spot, a 1993 film presentation in the Hallmark Hall of Fame
 Blind Spot, a 2008 documentary on peak oil by Adolfo Doring
 Blind Spot (2009 film), a Canadian drama film
 Blind Spot (2012 film), a Luxembourgian crime film 
 Blind Spot (2015 film), a Chinese suspense thriller film
 Blind Spot (2017 film), a Belgian thriller film
 Blind Spot (2018 film), a Norwegian drama film
 Blind Spot: Hitler's Secretary, the English title of Im toten Winkel (2002), an Austrian documentary about Traudl Junge, Adolf Hitler's last personal secretary
 Blindspotting, a 2018 American film

Television 
 Blindspot (TV series), a 2015 American drama TV series
 "Blind Spot" (Arrow), an episode of the TV series Arrow
 "Blind Spot" (Beverly Hills, 90210), an episode of the TV series Beverly Hills, 90210
 "Blind Spot" (Homeland), an episode of the TV series Homeland
 "Blind Spot" (Justified), an episode of the TV series Justified
 "Blind Spot" (Law & Order: Criminal Intent), an episode of Law & Order: Criminal Intent
 "Blind Spots" (Supergirl), an episode of Supergirl
 "Blindspots", an episode of Scream

Music
 Blindspot (album), a 2013 album by Dan Michaelson and The Coastguards
 Blind Spot (EP), a 2016 release by Lush
 Blindspott, a New Zealand band
 "Blind Spots", a song by C418 from the album Minecraft – Volume Beta

Other uses

 "Blind spot", one of four quadrants in the diagram of the Johari window, a self-help technique

See also
 Bias blind spot, the tendency to recognize bias in others, but not oneself
 Blind spot monitor

 Lacuna (disambiguation)